Craugastor berkenbuschii is a species of frog in the family Craugastoridae.
It is endemic to Mexico.
Its natural habitats are subtropical or tropical moist montane forests and rivers.
It is threatened by habitat loss.

References

berkenbuschii
Endemic amphibians of Mexico
Amphibians described in 1870
Taxa named by Wilhelm Peters
Taxonomy articles created by Polbot